Diana Dondoe (born December 22, 1982) is a Romanian model. She was discovered in Bucharest, Romania by Giani Portmann, a Romanian modelling scout. Dondoe resides in New York City, USA. Aside from modelling she is a student majoring in English and Spanish.
  
She appeared in many campaigns such as: Chanel, Miu Miu, Prada, Celine, Donna Karan, Moschino, Jean-Paul Gaultier, La Perla, Balenciaga and the Swedish clothing manufacturer H&M's beachwear collection. In 2009 she appeared in Rock and Republics' Spring and Summer ad campaign with Cartwright Lee. She also appeared on the covers of French Vogue, Japanese Vogue, Spanish Vogue, Self Service, ID Magazine, W, 10 Magazine and Flair. She was on the inaugural cover of WSJ.

In 2005 she posed for the Pirelli Calendar set in a tropical scenery of Rio de Janeiro, photographed in black and white by the French photographer Patrick Demarchelier.

In 2009 Dondoe appeared in the fashion documentary Picture Me: A Model's Diary, where the filmmaker Ole Schell documents the rise of model Sara Ziff. She lives in Paris, France, with her companion, French actor Xavier Lemaître.

Agencies 

IMG Models (New York City, United States)
IMG Models (London, United Kingdom)
IMG Models (Milan, Italy)
IMG Models (Paris, France)

References

External links

http://www.style.com/peopleparties/modelsearch/person920
http://www.gettyimages.fr/photographies/diana-dondoe-4343814#actor-xavier-lemaitre-and-his-companion-diana-dondoe-attend-the-by-picture-id847972014

 The Internet Fashion Database

1982 births
Living people
People from Craiova
Romanian female models